Matthew 7:27  is the twenty-seventh verse of the seventh chapter of the Gospel of Matthew in the New Testament. This verse finishes the Parable of the Wise and the Foolish Builders and is the closing verse of the Sermon on the Mount.

Content
In the original Greek according to Westcott-Hort this verse is:
και κατεβη η βροχη και ηλθον οι ποταμοι και επνευσαν οι ανεμοι και 
προσεκοψαν τη οικια εκεινη και επεσεν και ην η πτωσις αυτης μεγαλη

In the King James Version of the Bible the text reads:
 And the rain descended, and the floods came, and the winds blew, and 
beat upon that house; and it fell: and great was the fall of it.

The World English Bible translates the passage as:
"The rain came down, the floods came, and the winds blew, and 
beat on that house; and it fell—and great was its fall."

For a collection of other versions see BibleHub Matthew 7:27.

Analysis
The start of this verse is a repetition of Matthew 7:25, but in that verse the house built on rock didn't fall. There is also a slight change from the rain beating on the house to the rain beating against it. Matthew, unlike Luke's version does not give a reason for the house to fall, rather the reason is given for why the house built on stone survives. "Great was its fall" may well have been a proverbial term for complete destruction.

This warning of doom and destruction is the final line of Jesus' Sermon on the Mount. To Augustine it is "fear-inspiring"

Commentary from the Church Fathers
Rabanus Maurus: Or the great ruin is to be understood that with which the Lord will say to them that hear and do not, Go ye into everlasting fire. (Mat. 25:41.)

Jerome: Or otherwise; On sand which is loose and cannot be bound into one mass, all the doctrine of heretics is built so as to fall.

Hilary of Poitiers: Otherwise; By the showers He signifies the allurements of smooth and gently invading pleasures, with which the faith is at first watered as with spreading rills, afterwards comes down the rush of torrent floods, that is, the motions of fiercer desire, and lastly, the whole force of the driving tempests rages against it, that is, the universal spirits of the Devil's reign attack it.

Augustine:  Otherwise; Rain, when it is put to denote any evil, is understood as the darkness of superstition; rumours of men are compared to winds; the flood signifies the lust of the flesh, as it were flowing over the land, and because what is brought on by prosperity is broken off by adversity. None of these things does he fear who has his house founded upon a rock, that is, who not only hears the command of the Lord, but who also does it. And in all these he submits himself to danger, who hears and does not. For no man confirms in himself what the Lord commands, or himself hears, but by doing it. But it should be noted, that when he said, He that heareth these words of mine, He shows plainly enough that this sermon is made complete by all those precepts by which the Christian life is formed, so that with good reason they that desire to live according to them, may be compared to one that builds on a rock.

References

07:27